The Welsh Camerata is a chamber choir of 25-30 singers based in Cardiff, Wales, United Kingdom, specialising in the performance of early music. The choir is constituted as a company limited by guarantee.

History
It was founded in 2004 when early music expert Andrew Wilson-Dickson from the Royal Welsh College of Music & Drama agreed to lead the choir. Rehearsals take place in Canton, Cardiff.

Performance
The choir has performed with individuals and orchestral groups such as Buddug Verona James, Devon Baroque Orchestra, Welsh Baroque Orchestra, and Brandon Hill Chamber Orchestra. In 2014 it gave the first performance of Andrew Wilson-Dickson's large scale oratorio Karuṇā with soloists including Emma Kirkby, and in 2016 it premièred his reconstruction of J S Bach's St Mark Passion. Members of the choir have frequently recorded for the BBC Morning Service.

References

General sources
 Hercules, August 2005
 South Wales Argus, March 2009
 Karuna, November 2014
 Bach Mass in B Minor, 2016
 Cardiff Times, February 2017
 Church Times, April 2017
 Classical-Music.com, July 2017
 Seen and Heard International, December 2017
 Cowbridge Gem, June 2018
 Making Music, May 2019
 Art Scene in Wales, July 2019

External links
 The Welsh Camerata / Y Camerata Cymreig
 Andrew Wilson-Dickson

Welsh choirs
Early music choirs
Baroque music groups
Musical groups from Cardiff
British performers of Christian music